Nova Alvorada is a municipality in the state of Rio Grande do Sul, Brazil.  As of 2020, the estimated population was 3,663.

See also
List of municipalities in Rio Grande do Sul

References

Municipalities in Rio Grande do Sul